Foscarini is a surname. Notable people with the name include:

Antonio Foscarini (1570–1622), Venetian diplomat
Claudio Foscarini (born 1958), Italian football coach
Giovanni Paolo Foscarini ( 1600–1647), Italian guitarist, lutenist, theorist and composer
Marco Foscarini (1696–1763), Venetian poet, writer and statesman
Michele Foscarini (1632–1692), Venetian historian
Paolo Antonio Foscarini (1575–1616), Carmelite priest and scientist

See also 
8076 Foscarini, an asteroid